Legacy pollution or legacy pollutants  are persistent materials in the environment that were created through a polluting industry or process that have polluting effects after the process has finished. Frequently these include persistent organic pollutants, heavy metals or other chemicals residual in the environment long after the industrial or extraction processes that produced them. Often these are chemicals produced by industry and polluted before there was widespread awareness of the toxic effects of the pollutants, and subsequently regulated or banned. Notable legacy pollutants include mercury, PCBs, Dioxins and other chemicals that are widespread health and environmental effects. Common sites for legacy pollutants include mining sites, industrial parks, waterways contaminated by industry, and other dump sites.

These chemicals often have outsized impact in countries jurisdictions with little or no environmental monitoring or regulation—because the chemical were often produced in new jurisdictions after they were banned in more heavily regulated jurisdictions. Often in these countries, there is a lack of capacity in environmental regulatory, health and civic infrastructure to address the impact of the pollutants.

The impact of legacy pollutants can be visible many years after the initial polluting process, and require environmental remediation. Grassroots communities and environmental defender frequently advocate for responsibility of industry and states through  Environmental justice action and advocacy for recognition of human rights, such as the Right to a healthy environment.

Types of sites

Brownfields

Mine tailings

Abandoned mines

Abandoned gas wells

International policy 
The Stockholm Convention on Persistent Organic Pollutants is one of the main international mechanisms for supporting the elimination of legacy persistent organic pollutants such as PCBs.

References 

Pollution